Gábor Kovács may refer to:

 Gábor Kovács (financier) (born 1957), Hungarian financier, banker and philanthropist
 Gábor Kovács (footballer, born September 1987), Hungarian association football defender
 Gábor Kovács (footballer, born October 1987), Hungarian association football striker
 Gábor Kovács (water polo) (born 1989), Hungarian water polo player